Clemens is both a Late Latin masculine given name and a surname meaning "merciful". Notable people with the name include:

Surname
 Adelaide Clemens (born 1989), Australian actress.
 Andrew Clemens (b. 1852 or 1857–1894), American folk artist
 Aurelius Prudentius Clemens, 4th century Roman poet
 Avery Jae Clemens, Australian model and social media influencer
 Barry Clemens (born 1943), American basketball player
 Bert A. Clemens (1874–1935), American politician
 Brian Clemens (born 1931), British screenwriter and television producer
 Clayton Clemens, American Professor of Government
 Dan Clemens (1945–2019), American politician
 Gabriel Clemens (born 1983), German darts player
 George T. Clemens (1902–1992), American cinematographer
 Harold W. Clemens (1918–1998), American politician
 C. Herbert Clemens (born 1939), American mathematician
 Isaac Clemens (1815–1880), Canadian farmer and politician
 Jacob Clemens non Papa (c. 1510 to 1515–1555 or 1556), Franco-Flemish composer of the Renaissance
 James Clemens (disambiguation), multiple people
 Jean Clemens (1880–1909), youngest daughter of Samuel Langhorne Clemens (Mark Twain)
 Jeremiah Clemens (1814–1865), U.S. senator and novelist
 Josef Clemens (born 1947), German bishop
 Joseph Clemens (1862–1936), American missionary and plant collector
 Joseph Clemens of Bavaria (1671–1723), German archbishop
 Kellen Clemens (born 1983), American football player
 Koby Clemens (born 1986), American baseball player
 Kody Clemens (born 1996), American baseball player
 Marcus Arrecinus Clemens (disambiguation), multiple people
 Martin Clemens, British World War II soldier and Solomon Islands coastwatcher
 Mary Strong Clemens (1873–1968), American botanist and plant collector
 Mazie E. Clemens (1890s–1952), American journalist and WWI war correspondent
 Olivia Langdon Clemens (1845–1904), wife of Samuel Langhorne Clemens (Mark Twain)
 Orion Clemens (1825–1897), brother of Samuel Langhorne Clemens (Mark Twain)
 Paul Clemens (born 1988), American baseball player
 Roger Clemens (born 1962), American baseball player
 Mark Twain, pen name of Samuel Langhorne Clemens (1835–1910), American author
 Sherrard Clemens (1820–1881), American politician and lawyer
 Titus Flavius Clemens (consul), great-nephew of the Roman Emperor Vespasian and (as Flavius Clemens) a saint in the Greek Orthodox Church
 William Clemens (film director) (1905–1980), American film director

Given name
 Clemens (rapper), (born 1979), real name Clemens Legolas Telling, Danish rapper, singer, music writer, actor
 Clemens (impostor) (died c. 15 AD), ancient Roman
 Clemens Alexandrinus (Clement of Alexandria, c. 150–c. 215), Christian theologian
 Clemens Arnold (born 1978), German field hockey player
 Clemens Baeumker (1853–1924), German historian of philosophy
 Clemens Bollen (born 1948), German politician
 Clemens Brentano (1778–1842), German poet and novelist
 Clemens Denhardt (1852–1929), German explorer of Africa
 Clemens Fritz (born 1980), German footballer
 Clemens Maria Hofbauer (1751–1820), patron saint of Vienna
 Clemens Holzmeister (1886–1983), Austrian architect
 Clemens Kalischer (born 1921), German-American photographer
 Clemens von Ketteler (1853–1900), German diplomat
 Clemens Klotz (1886–1969), German architect
 Clemens Krauss (1893–1954), Austrian conductor
 Clemens Rehbein (born 1992), German musician
 Clemens August Graf von Galen (1878–1946), German count, Bishop of Münster, and Cardinal of the Roman Catholic Church
 Clemens von Pirquet (1874–1929), Austrian scientist and pediatrician
 Clemens Wenceslaus of Saxony (1739–1812), Saxon prince, Archbishop-Elector of Trier, Prince-Bishop of Freising, Prince-Bishop of Regensburg and Prince-Bishop of Augsburg
 Clemens Westerhof (born 1940), Dutch football manager
 Clemens Wilmenrod (1906–1967), German television cook
 Clemens Winkler (1838–1904), German chemist

Fictional characters
 Dr. Jonathan Clemens, a character in the 1992 film Alien 3 played by the British Actor Charles Dance
 See Cambridge Latin Course for Clemens, a fictional slave

See also 
 Mount Clemens, Michigan, American city
 Mount Clemens High School
 Munsinger Gardens and Clemens Gardens, gardens in St Cloud, Minnesota, USA
Clemens Automobile Company Building, listed on the National Register of Historic Places in Polk County, Iowa
 Clemens church, Swedish church building
 Clemons (surname)
 Clemons (disambiguation)
 Clemmons (disambiguation)
 Kliment (disambiguation), a given name
 Clemente
 Klemen, a given name
 Klemens
 Clement (name), the common Anglified form of the classical name Clemens.

Masculine given names
Dutch masculine given names
German masculine given names
Surnames from given names